The 2005 Western Kentucky Hilltoppers football team represented Western Kentucky University in the 2005 NCAA Division I-AA football season and were coached by David Elson. The Hilltoppers started the season strong, but after being ranked number 1 in Division I-AA, they lost their last four games and failed to make the playoffs for the first time since 1999. 

The team included future National Football League (NFL) players Curtis Hamilton and Greg Ryan. Erik Losey and Antonio Thomas were named to the AP All American team and Chris James made the 1AA All-Star Team. The All-Conference team included Losey, Thomas, James, Lerron Moore, Marion Rumph, Deion Holts, Dennis Mitchell, and Daniel Williams.

Schedule

FIU's win was later vacated by the NCAA due to infractions.

References

Western Kentucky
Western Kentucky Hilltoppers football seasons
Western Kentucky Hilltoppers football